Victory is the fifteenth studio album by the Jacksons. It was released by Epic Records on July 2, 1984. This was the only album to include all six Jackson brothers together as an official group.

Victory was certified 2× Platinum by the Recording Industry Association of America (RIAA) in the United States in October 1984. It peaked at number four on the US Billboard 200 albums chart. Its most successful single, "State of Shock", peaked at number three on the US Billboard Hot 100 songs chart. Victory was supported by the Victory Tour, with Michael, who had recently released the world's all-time best-selling album, Thriller (1982), being prominently featured on the tour's setlist. None of the songs from Victory were performed on the tour.

Shortly after the Victory Tour ended, Michael and Marlon Jackson quit the group to pursue solo careers. Jermaine, Tito, Randy, and Jackie Jackson continued on as the Jacksons and released one more album, 1989's 2300 Jackson Street (whose title track did feature all six Jackson brothers, along with their sisters Janet and Rebbie), before splitting up.

Victory saw a digital expanded reissue on April 30, 2021 alongside other Jacksons albums.

Recording

After a successful reunion on the Motown 25 television special in 1983, Jermaine Jackson decided to return to the group, having left Motown after nine years as a full-fledged soloist. His brothers had left Motown for Epic in 1975, but despite the reunion, the brothers rarely worked together on the album; it was mainly composed of solo songs the brothers had each worked on during that time. Each brother had a solo song on the album: Michael on "Be Not Always", Randy on “One More Chance” and “The Hurt", Tito on “We Can Change the World", Jackie on “Wait" and Marlon on “Body.” Jermaine only sings co-lead vocals with Michael on "Torture". He also performs ad-libs on "Wait" and is additionally named as a background vocalist on "One More Chance" and "The Hurt". "Torture" was originally planned to be a duet between Michael and Jackie (the song's writer), but when Jermaine officially re-joined the group, he took over the parts intended for Jackie (who can still be heard during the song's chorus and ad-libs).

The album only had two videos — for the songs "Torture" and "Body" — and neither Jermaine nor Michael appeared in either one. A wax dummy of Michael from Madame Tussauds acted as a stand in for the "Torture" video.

Michael recorded "State of Shock", a duet originally recorded with Queen lead vocalist Freddie Mercury. The duo were unable to finish the track, so Michael ended up recording a second version of the track with Rolling Stones frontman Mick Jagger.

Artwork
Tensions reportedly grew between the brothers during the recording sessions and as a result, minimal publicity photography was done.

The album cover art was commissioned from famed illustrator Michael Whelan. On the first release of the record there was a white dove on Randy's shoulder (third from left). On later issues the bird was removed.

Singles 
The song "State of Shock" peaked at No. 3 on the Billboard Hot 100. The second single, "Torture", reached No. 17, and "Body", the third single, became a moderate hit peaking at No. 47. The album peaked at No. 4 on the Billboard 200 in the week of August 4, 1984. The fourth single, "Wait", was released in 1985 in the UK, Canada and Brazil only - it is not known to have charted anywhere, and was possibly withdrawn. The single version of "Wait" is a remix which features a slap bassline in place of the original synth bass, as well as additional lead synth - and has never been released elsewhere.

Track listing

Production 
Produced by: Jackie Jackson , David Paich, Steve Porcaro and Jackie Jackson , Randy Jackson , Michael Jackson , Tito Jackson , the Jacksons, David Paich and Steve Porcaro , Marlon Jackson 
Engineers: Brent Averil , Bill Bottrell , Tito Jackson , Tom Knox , Bruce Swedien 
Assistant engineers: Niko Bolas , Ollie Cotton , Paul Erickson , Bino Espinoza , Matt Forger , Stuart Furusho , Mitch Gibson , Mike Hatcher , Shep Longsdale , Brian Malouf , Terry Stewart , John Van Nest 
Additional recordings technicians: Allen Sides, Ann Calnan, Brent Averill, Brian Malouf, Jermany Smith, Michael Schulman, Robin Laine
Mixing: Niko Bolas , Bill Bottrell , Greg Ladanyi , Bruce Swedien

Personnel
The Jacksons
Randy Jackson – lead vocals , background vocals , keyboards & synthesizers , percussion , drum programming , arrangements 
Jackie Jackson – lead vocals , background vocals , vocal ad libs and horn arrangements , arrangements 
Michael Jackson – lead vocals , background vocals , Linn LM-1 programming & handclaps , arrangements 
Marlon Jackson – lead vocals, keyboards, synthesizer, Linn LM-1 programming, and arrangements , background vocals 
Tito Jackson – lead vocals, guitars, keyboards, synthesizer, drum programming, synthesizer programming, and arrangements , background vocals 
Jermaine Jackson – lead vocals , background vocals 

Additional musicians

John Barnes – Fairlight CMI , additional synthesizers & arrangements 
Michael Boddicker – keyboards, synthesizers, synth horns, and synth programming 
Lenny Castro – percussion 
Paulinho da Costa – percussion 
Nathan East – bass 
David Ervin – additional synth programming , additional synthesizer 
Mick Jagger – lead vocals 
Louis Johnson – bass 
Gayle Levant – harp 
Steve Lukather – guitar 
Jonathan Moffett – Simmons drums 
Johnny Ray Nelson – background vocals 
David Paich – keyboards, synthesizer and arrangements 
Jeff Porcaro – drums 
Steve Porcaro – keyboards and synthesizer , arrangements 
Greg Poree – acoustic guitar 
Robin Renee Ross – viola 
Jack Wargo – guitar solo 
David Williams – guitar  , bass 
Greg Wright – guitar solo 

Additional arrangements and artwork
Murray Adler – concertmaster 
Jerry Hey – trumpet and horn arrangements , string arrangements 
Derek Nakamoto – additional synth programming 
Painting by Michael Whelan
Photography by Mathew Rolston

Charts
This became the Jacksons' only studio album to top a national chart.

Certifications

Remastered version
A remastered version was released in July 2009 in Japan only, with cardboard sleeve (mini LP) packaging. It was part of a six-album Jacksons cardboard sleeve (mini LP) reissue series, featuring the albums The Jacksons (1976), Goin' Places (1977), Destiny (1978), Triumph (1980), The Jacksons Live! (1981), and Victory (1984).

See also
 Victory Tour (The Jacksons tour)

References

External links
 The Jackson 5 - Victory (1984) album review by William Ruhlmann, credits & releases at AllMusic
 The Jackson 5 - Victory (1984) album releases & credits at Discogs
 The Jackson 5 - Victory (1984) album to be listened as stream on Spotify

Victory (album)
Victory (album)
Albums produced by Michael Jackson
Albums produced by Greg Ladanyi
Epic Records albums
Albums with cover art by Michael Whelan
Albums recorded at Sunset Sound Recorders
Albums recorded at United Western Recorders
Albums recorded at Westlake Recording Studios